Year at Danger is a 2007 independent documentary film. Nine days after his marriage, Steve Metze found out that he was being deployed as part of Operation Iraqi Freedom. Metze, a West Point graduate, Desert Storm veteran, and documentary filmmaker, decided to pack a camera and document his year in Iraq. The film consists of footage shot by Metze during his deployment to Iraq and was edited by Don Swaynos.

It won the Grand Jury Award at the 2008 DeadCENTER Film Festival and was an Official Selection of the 2007 Austin Film Festival and the 2008 GI Film Festival.

External links 
 Year at Danger Official Site
 

2007 films
Documentary films about the Iraq War
American documentary films
2007 documentary films
2000s English-language films
2000s American films